Narayamkulam is a village in Kottur Panjayath, Kozhikode district, India.

Demographics
Most of the people are Hindus and there are many Muslim families. T. P. Rajeevan, Veerankutty and Madhusoodanan Cherukkad, Lineesh Narayamkulam and Parvana Abhilash are famous people from Narayamkulam.

Geography
Veyapara is the highest place in Narayamkulam. We can see all of Kozhikode and western part of Wayanad from Veyapara.

Economy
People are following many kinds of economic cooperation like:

 Panam payattu
 Sahayakuri

There are many kutumbasree units and Touring club. Contributions of the same are valuable in the economic and social development of the village.

Thandappuram is the main part of Narayamkulam.

Transportation
Narayamkulam village connects to other parts of India through Vatakara town on the west and Kuttiady town on the east.  National Highway No. 66 passes through Vatakara and the northern stretch connects to Mangalore, Goa and Mumbai.  The southern stretch connects to Cochin and Trivandrum.  The eastern National Highway No.54 going through Kuttiady connects to Mananthavady, Mysore and Bangalore. The nearest airports are at Kannur and Kozhikode.  The nearest railway station is at Koyilandy.

References

Villages in Kozhikode district
Kuttiady area